The Mannings are an American family who have gained fame via numerous family members playing American football (specifically the position of quarterback) and are considered to be a dynasty within the sport. Archie Manning from Mississippi, was the first Manning to play in the National Football League (NFL), spending the majority of his career playing for the New Orleans Saints based in New Orleans, Louisiana. The Manning family has since resided in Louisiana.

Three members of the Manning Family–Archie, Peyton, and Eli–have had successful collegiate and professional football careers playing collegiately in the National Collegiate Athletic Association (NCAA), specifically in the Southeastern Conference (SEC), and professionally in the National Football League (NFL). The Manning's football awards include two College Football Hall of Fame inductions, 20 cumulative Pro Bowl selections, seven first-team All-Pro selections, five NFL MVP awards, six Super Bowl appearances, four Super Bowl victories, three Super Bowl MVP awards, five ESPY Awards, and one Pro Football Hall of Fame induction. Two members went on into the field of sports broadcasting after their retirement from football and collaborated to win a Sports Emmy Award.

History

First generation 
Archie played collegiately for Ole Miss, and professionally for the New Orleans Saints, Houston Oilers, and the Minnesota Vikings. He is a two-time Pro Bowl selection, a first team All-American, and an inductee in the College Football Hall of Fame.

Second generation 
Archie's three sons have played football to varying degrees:

Cooper played football in high school and committed to play at his father's alma mater of Ole Miss, but was forced to stop playing after being diagnosed with spinal stenosis while still in high school.
Peyton played collegiately at Tennessee - where he was a Consensus All-American - and professionally for the Indianapolis Colts and the Denver Broncos, making two Super Bowl appearances with each team and winning one Super Bowl with each team. He is also a five-time NFL MVP, MVP of Super Bowl XLI, a 14-time Pro Bowl selection, an inductee in both the College Football and Pro Football Hall of Fame, and also has five ESPY Awards (three for Best NFL Player, one for Best Championship Performance, and one for Outstanding Team with the Colts in 2007).
Eli played collegiately at Ole Miss, and professionally for the New York Giants, winning two Super Bowls (along with two Super Bowl MVPs), and is a four-time Pro Bowl selection.

Third generation 
Arch, the oldest son of Cooper, is a high school quarterback and is considered a top college prospect for the class of 2023.  On June 23, 2022, Arch announced he had committed to play for The University of Texas in 2023.

Manning family tree 
Archie (born 1949)
Cooper (born 1974)
May (born 2002)
Arch (born 2005)
Heid (born 2006)
Peyton (born 1976)
Marshall (born 2011)
Mosley (born 2011)
Eli (born 1981)
Ava (born 2011)
Lucy (born 2013)
Caroline (born 2015)
Charles (born 2019)

References

Families from Louisiana
Manning family
National Football League families
Players of American football from Louisiana